Daniel P. Foust House is a historic home located near Whitsett, Guilford County, North Carolina. It consists of a two-story, three-bay Greek Revival style block built about 1856, with a two-story, triple-gable, frame Italianate style main block built between 1867 and 1881. It features an elaborately decorated two-tiered front porch.  Also on the property is a contributing granary (c. 1860) and cold frame (c. 1880).

It was listed on the National Register of Historic Places in 2005.

References

Houses on the National Register of Historic Places in North Carolina
Greek Revival houses in North Carolina
Italianate architecture in North Carolina
Houses completed in 1856
Houses in Guilford County, North Carolina
National Register of Historic Places in Guilford County, North Carolina